Grădiștea is a commune in Călărași County, Muntenia, Romania. It is composed of four villages: Bogata, Cunești, Grădiștea and Rasa. As of 2007 the population of Grădiștea is 4,731.

Natives
Virgil I. Bărbat

References

Communes in Călărași County
Localities in Muntenia